Empressite is a mineral form of silver telluride, AgTe.
It is a rare, grey, orthorhombic mineral with which can form compact masses, rarely as bipyramidal crystals.

Recent crystallographic analysis has confirmed that empressite is a distinct mineral with orthorhombic crystal structure, different from the hexagonal Ag5−xTe3 with which empressite has been commonly confused in mineralogy literature. 
At the same time, empressite does not appear on the equilibrium Ag-Te phase diagram, and therefore it is only metastable at ambient conditions. Given infinite time, it would phase separate into pure Ag5Te3 and pure Te.

The name empressite comes from the location of its discovery – the Empress Josephine mine, Saguache County, Colorado, US. It was first described in 1914.

References

Silver minerals
Telluride minerals
Orthorhombic minerals
Minerals in space group 62
Minerals described in 1914